The Republicans is a non-partisan think tank and association in Italy, that operates like federation between several conservative and libertarian organization, as Tea Party Italy, Modernize Italy, as well as businessmen, local politicians and activist.

The organization, launched by Marco Reguzzoni (member and former leader in the Chamber of Deputies of Lega Nord) and Nunzia De Girolamo (member and former leader in the Chamber of the New Centre-Right) on 2 June 2015 (Republic Day), aims at uniting the Italian centre-right by taking example from the United States Republican Party and American-styled fusionism between conservative and libertarian political propositions.

In June the Varese provincial section of Lega Lombarda–Lega Nord expelled Reguzzoni from the party for having launched The Republicans.

Program
The association support several reforms, overstep the parties:
 Cut to public spending and tax cut
 Laws for the political transparency and against bureaucracy
 Abolition of the property tax and the taxes on salaries and pensions
 VAT on 15%
 Income tax on 20%
 Free trade between enterprises of different countries
 Abolition of the Dublin Regulation and immigration reform

Leadership
President: Marco Reguzzoni (2015–present)

References

External links
Official website

2015 establishments in Italy
Political and economic think tanks based in the European Union
Libertarian think tanks
Non-profit organisations based in Italy
Think tanks based in Italy
Libertarianism in Italy